The 2017 IIHF Women's World Championship Division I was two international ice hockey tournaments organised by the International Ice Hockey Federation. The Division I Group A tournament was played in Graz, Austria, from 15 to 21 April 2017, and the Division I Group B tournament was played in Katowice, Poland, from 8 to 14 April 2017.

Venues

Division I Group A

Participants

Match officials
4 referees and 7 linesmen were selected for the tournament.

Referees
 Tijana Haack
 Debby Hengst
 Maija Kontturi
 Kristine Morrison

Linesmen
 Mirjam Gruber
 Julia Kainberger
 Anne Kuonen
 Jodi Price
 Michaela Štefková
 Vanessa Stratton
 Svenja Strohmenger

Final standings

Results
All times are local (UTC+2).

Awards and statistics

Awards
Best players selected by the directorate:
 Best Goaltender:  Anikó Németh
 Best Defenceman:  Ayaka Toko
 Best Forward:  Denise Altmann
Source: IIHF.com

Scoring leaders
List shows the top skaters sorted by points, then goals.

GP = Games played; G = Goals; A = Assists; Pts = Points; +/− = Plus/minus; PIM = Penalties in minutes; POS = Position
Source: IIHF.com

Leading goaltenders
Only the top five goaltenders, based on save percentage, who have played at least 40% of their team's minutes, are included in this list.

TOI = Time on ice (minutes:seconds); SA = Shots against; GA = Goals against; GAA = Goals against average; Sv% = Save percentage; SO = Shutouts
Source: IIHF.com

Division I Group B

Participants

Match officials
4 referees and 7 linesmen were selected for the tournament.

Referees
 Maria Füchsel
 Ainslie Gardner
 Meghan Mallette
 Ulrike Winklmayr

Linesmen
 Marine Dinant
 Daniela Kiefer
 Diana Mokhova
 Trine Phillipsen
 Joanna Pobożniak
 Jenna Puhakka
 Sueva Torribio

Final standings

Results
All times are local (UTC+2).

Awards and statistics

Awards
Best players selected by the directorate:
 Best Goaltender:  Daria Dmitrieva
 Best Defenceman:  Iveta Klimášová
 Best Forward:  Līga Miljone 
Source: IIHF.com

Scoring leaders
List shows the top skaters sorted by points, then goals.

GP = Games played; G = Goals; A = Assists; Pts = Points; +/− = Plus/minus; PIM = Penalties in minutes; POS = Position
Source: IIHF.com

Leading goaltenders
Only the top five goaltenders, based on save percentage, who have played at least 40% of their team's minutes, are included in this list.

TOI = Time on ice (minutes:seconds); SA = Shots against; GA = Goals against; GAA = Goals against average; Sv% = Save percentage; SO = Shutouts
Source: IIHF.com

References

External links
Official website of IIHF

Division I
2017
2017 IIHF Women's World Championship Division I
2017 IIHF Women's World Championship Division I
IIHF Women's World Championship Division I
IIHF Women's World Championship Division I
2017 IIHF Women's World Championship Division I
2017 IIHF Women's World Championship Division I
April 2017 sports events in Europe
21st century in Katowice